Jorge Alberto Poza Pérez ( born 3 January 1977) is a Mexican film and television actor.

Biography 
Poza was born in Tulancingo, Hidalgo, Mexico. He started his acting career in the movie Bandidos in 1990, but his career as a TV actor started in 1992 in the telenovela El abuelo y yo by Pedro Damian  along with Gael García Bernal. Then he got involved in other projects or more and less success.

In 2001 he worked in the novela Atrévete a olvidarme, which only lasted a month on air, but a couple of months later he was called by the TV producer Carla Estrada to offer him a character in her new novela El Manantial. In 2002 he was called by another TV producer Pedro Damián and was offered his first starring role as professor Francisco Romero in the famous novela Clase 406.

Velo de novia in 2003 represented a new challenge for him, since he had to play two characters: twins Rafael and Ernesto, the first one bad and dominant and the other one good and shy. He also worked in theatre in the play P.D. tu gato ha muerto along with Otto Sirgo. Trying to get away from acting for a while, he hosted a morning TV show called Hoy which has been Televisa's morning show for years, changing the casts in different periods. During his time with the show, he worked with Andrea Legarreta and Vielka Valenzuela.

He also worked on the novela Alma de Hierro as the blind son of the famous Mexican actors: Blanca Guerra and Alejandro Camacho. He also played in the first episode of Mujeres Asesinas 3 titled Elena, Protectora''' with Rocio Banquells.

In 2011 he starred in the Mexican version of Rafaela with Scarlet Ortiz and produced by Nathalie Lartilleux. The following year, in 2012, he played his first antagonistic in Cachito de Cielo with Maite Perroni and Pedro Fernandez. In 2014, he had his second main antagonistic as Pablo's, brother Mariano Martinez Negrete, in the Mexican version's La Gata with reunited his co-star Maite Perroni and Daniel Arenas, under the production of Nathalie Larrilleux.

Personal life
In 1997 he married actress Mayrín Villanueva, whom he met while filming the telenovela Preciosa'' in that same year. Although they broke up in 2008, the couple had 2 children: Romina and Sebastián were born in 2003. From 2009 until 2012, he dated actress Zuria Vega while filming Alma de hierro. In 2016 he began dating actress Ilse Ikeda whom he met while filming El hotel de los secretos in that same year.

Filmography

Films

Television

Awards and nominations

TVyNovelas Awards

Premios Diosas de Plata

References

External links
 
 Jorge's Biography

Mexican television personalities
Mexican male film actors
Mexican male telenovela actors
People from Tulancingo
Living people
1977 births